Before World War II, the Imperial Japanese Navy began construction of various airfields, fortifications, ports, and other military projects in the islands controlled under the South Seas Mandate. It was from these fortifications in Palau, the Carolines and the Marshall Islands that a significant portion of the Japanese Navy disembarked towards the Philippines, New Guinea, Nauru and the Gilbert Islands during 1941–42 in the Pacific War.

By 1990 Japanese involvement in the newly independent island nations of Oceania increased due to rising commercial and strategic interests. Japan's rapidly growing aid to the South Pacific was seen by many as a response to United States calls for greater burden-sharing and to the adoption of the 1982 Convention on the Law of the Sea, which gave states legal control over fishery resources within their  exclusive economic zones. The US$98.3 million that Japan provided in aid to the region in 1989 was fourth behind France, Australia and the United States but was significantly more than was provided by New Zealand and Britain. Japanese companies also invested heavily in the tourism industry in the island nations.

See also

Australia–Japan relations
New Zealand–Japan relations
Japan–Tonga relations
Oceania
South Seas Mandate (1919–45)
Sino-Pacific relations

 
Foreign relations of Japan by region